Elvira Laura Albornoz Pollmann (born 27 March 1968) is a Chilean lawyer, academic, researcher and politician. She served as Minister of Women's Affairs (the National Women's Service) (May 2006-March 2010) during President Michelle Bachelet's first term as President of Chile. She has also served as president of the Inter-American Commission of Women.

References

External links

1968 births
Chilean academics
Government ministers of Chile
Christian Democratic Party (Chile) politicians
Living people
20th-century Chilean politicians 
20th-century Chilean women politicians 
21st-century Chilean politicians 
21st-century Chilean women politicians
Women government ministers of Chile